Typhoon Lingling, known in the Philippines as Typhoon Nanang, was a deadly typhoon that struck the Philippines and China in 2001 and caused 379 deaths. The name "Lingling" was given by Hong Kong. The 39th tropical depression, 22nd named storm, and 13th typhoon of the 2001 Pacific typhoon season, Lingling developed into a tropical depression on November 6 and given the local name Nanang by the PAGASA. The next day, it was upgraded into a tropical storm and given the name Lingling by the Japan Meteorological Agency (JMA). Lingling's intensity briefly stagnated as it moved over Visayas before resuming intensification and intensifying into a severe tropical storm on November 8. One day later, both the JMA and the Joint Typhoon Warning Center (JTWC) upgraded Lingling to a typhoon as it exited the Philippine archipelago and moved into the South China Sea. Lingling began to weaken as it approached the Vietnamese coast, before making landfall on November 11 at 18:00 UTC. Lingling rapidly weakened afterward, dissipating on November 12.

A total of 379 people were killed, of which 359 came from the Philippines and 20 came from Vietnam. The province of Camiguin was the most heavily affected, with multiple landslides killing hundreds of people. Lingling caused a total of $60 million in damage.

Meteorological history 

At 19:00 UTC on November 3, the Joint Typhoon Warning Center (JTWC) began monitoring an area of convection approximately 120 nm east-southeast of Yap, assessing its development potential as poor due to infrared satellite imagery indicating disorganized convection. Surface analysis the next morning showed that the disturbance was located within a monsoon trough without a closed circulation, though the convection was located within a favorable for intensification. The next day on November 5 at 6:00 UTC, the JTWC upgraded its development potential to fair as satellite imagery showed multiple low-level circulations within a broader circulation. The disturbance continued organizing, and on the same day at 20:30 UTC, the JTWC issued a Tropical Cyclone Formation Alert (TCFA) on the system.

Lingling continued to the west-northwest, primarily steered by a mid-level high situated over northern Vietnam and southern China. Lingling continued intensifying, and by November 9, the JTWC and the JMA upgraded Lingling to a typhoon, with the JMA doing so later in the day.

After Lingling intensified into a typhoon, it began to quickly intensify as it tracked along the southern edge of a strong monsoonal northeasterly surge. Gales from the storm extended 170 nm in all quadrants, with it extending up to 250 nm in the northwestern quadrant; the eye's diameter at this time was 25 nm. Lingling then began to weaken thereafter, with the JMA downgrading it to a severe tropical storm and the JTWC downgrading it to a Category-2 equivalent cyclone as it made landfall near Qui Nhơn on November 11 at 18:00 UTC. After making landfall, Lingling rapidly weakened, with the JMA downgrading it to a tropical depression and the JTWC downgrading it to a tropical storm on November 12 at 0:00 UTC. The JTWC issued its final warning on the system hours later at 6:00 UTC, with the JMA doing the same at 12:00 UTC. Lingling degenerated into an area of low pressure over northern Cambodia the same night.

Impact

Philippines 

A majority of the fatalities in the Philippines came from the municipality of Mahinog in Camiguin, where landslides, debris flows, and flash floods flattened hundreds of shanties. 15 people died in Cebu, of which 11 died due to a tunnel collapse in a copper mine. Another 10 people drowned on Negros Island, with another person being killed in Bohol. A Panamanian cargo vessel sank off the coast of Pangasinan, with the 19 people on board being reported missing.

A state of calamity was declared in the provinces of Negros Occidental, Capiz, Aklan, Antique, and Camiguin due to extensive damages to property and loss of life by President Gloria Macapagal Arroyo on November 26. In total, 359 people were killed (of which 229 presumed dead) and 147 were injured. Lingling caused $22.7 million in the Philippines.

Camiguin
Rainfall of 517 millimeters was observed on November 7, with 7 thousand families in Camiguin being affected. The Philippine Tactical Operations command conducted relief operations on Camiguin, though many government agencies including the Armed Forces of the Philippines were unable to land on the island due to bad weather. Lingling effectively isolated Camiguin for 2 weeks, with the future governor Jurdin Jesus Romualdo describing it as "the worst crisis that we had in Camiguin in recent history." The Hubangon and Pontod river basins in Camiguin suffered the most serious damage. Several people died in floods, with other people being struck by fallen trees and debris caused by a tornado hitting the island. There were fears of disease outbreaks due to lack of clean drinking water and cases of diarrhea in evacuation centers.

Vietnam 
In Phú Yên Province, 15 people were killed, with Bình Định Province and Quảng Ngãi receiving 2 fatalities each, and 1 person being killed in Thừa Thiên Huế Province.

In total, 20 people were killed, 131 were injured, with Lingling causing $37.3 million in damages in Vietnam.

Aftermath 
The local name Nanang was retired and replaced with Nando for the 2005 season due to the damages it caused in the Philippines.

See also 

 2001 Pacific typhoon season

References 

2001 Pacific typhoon season
Typhoons in the Philippines
2001 in the Philippines
2001 in Vietnam
Typhoons in Vietnam